The 1946 Giro d'Italia was the 29th edition of the Giro d'Italia, organized and sponsored by the newspaper La Gazzetta dello Sport.

The race was won by Gino Bartali of the Legnano team, with fellow Italians Fausto Coppi and Vito Ortelli coming in second and third respectively.

Participants

The 1946 Giro d'Italia was contested by seven teams and six groups. Each team consisted of seven riders, while each group was made up of four cyclists. This made the starting peloton total 79 riders. Nearly half of the riders were starting their first edition of the Giro. Of the riders that began the race, only 40 were able to complete the race. Joseph Magnani became the first American, and by the virtue North American, to compete in the Giro. The peloton was entirely Italian as Italy was technically still at war with most other countries.

After having ridden together on Legnano at the last Giro and until World War II halted professional cycling in Italy, Fausto Coppi (Bianchi) and Gino Bartali (Legnano) entered the Giro now on different teams. Coppi started the season in great form and won the Milan–San Remo by over fourteen minutes after riding nearly the whole race alone. Tensions between the two riders elevated after May's Züri-Metzgete, where Bartali asked Coppi to help him to the finish and, if so, he would not contest the race to the line. Coppi agreed, but Bartali attacked as Coppi adjusted his toe straps and won the race, angering Coppi. Together, they were seen as favorites to win the race. Mario Ricci, Adolfo Leoni, Aldo Bini, and Glauco Servadei also received consideration as riders to win the opening stage. Vito Ortelli was another other main contenders for the race win. In interview with the Unione Velocipedistica Italiana president Borroni, Bartali stated that he only wanted to ride the Giro in order to get granted permission to ride the Tour de Suisse. Fermo Camellini and Oreste Conte received attention as threats to win the race. A notable exclusion was Fiorenzo Magni who was not allowed to participate due to a suspension by the UVI.

The squads entering the race were:

Trade teams

 
 
 Legnano
 Olmo
 
 
 

Groups

 Milan-Gazzetta
 V. C. Bustese
 Fronte Della Gioventu'-Duluz
 Enal-Campari
 Azzini-Freni Universal
 Centro Sportivo Italiano

Route and stages

The Italian Cycling Federation announced on 7 December 1945 that several of bike races would be return the following season including the likes of the Giro, Giro di Lombardia, Milan–San Remo, and more. The significance of the restart was noted by a l'Unità writer who wrote: "... this Giro makes the idea of unity of our nation concrete..." The paper even took to referring it as the Giro della Rinascita. Cities in Italy submitted requests to be hosts for the stages of the Giro by 28 January 1946. As planning started, there were problems that arose: as the bombing from the war had destroyed bridges and roads significantly. The damages to the railroad system and the southern roads in particular, limited the Giro to the land north of Naples. A main concern of race organizers was the date of the Italian elections, which was announced to be on 2 June by the Council of Ministers. To avoid overlapping with the election, on 13 March the event was announced, and that it would start on 15 June and end on 7 July. The route was fully revealed on 11 April. The route was viewed to be largely symbolic in nature as it visited sites that were related to events from the First and Second World Wars like Trento, Bassano del Grappa, and Piave. Pope Pius XII wrote to La Gazzetta dello Sport and mentioned he would offer an audience if the race were to pass through Rome, which the organizers obliged and the riders had the opportunity to meet the Pope.

The day before the race started, organizers announced the stage from Rovigo to the Allied controlled Trieste could not finish in Trieste and its finish would be moved to Vittorio Veneto. Trieste was then under British and American control as Italy and Yugoslavia disputed the land. This decision caused controversy both within Trieste and across Italy and the government soon began to negotiate for a finish in Trieste. After the race had started, on 22 June, the Allied Military Command announced that the originally planned finish in Trieste would be allowed.

Race overview

The twelfth leg of the race started at 6:25 AM local time. British radio (A.I.S.) stated that a large trunk was placed on the road two kilometers after Pieris, on the border of Venezia Giulia. Stones were thrown at the riders and the local polic followed the race and dispersed the crowds. Shots were fired and the police responded, which led to people hiding in the bushes shooting upon the police and them retaliating until the crowd and the shooters dispersed. The cyclists met to determine if they would still ride, some rode to Udine, while others rode to Miramare reached the Montebello race course by bicycle. The race jury released a statement stated that an unexpected event happened where stones were thrown at riders, along with nails and other obstacles being placed in the road. The same time was awarded to all the riders. After a long pause in action, the riders continued to race to Trieste's finish, in the Montebello hippodrome for the stage victory. The start of the stage from Udine to Auronzo was moved to Tuesday. Trieste's Giro d'Italia committee announced that no riders had been seriously injured. Marangonni and Pasquini had abrasions and could continue racing.

Classification leadership

The leader of the general classification – calculated by adding the stage finish times of each rider – wore a pink jersey. This classification is the most important of the race, and its winner is considered as the winner of the Giro. A similar classification to the general classification was the "aggruppati" classification which was calculated in the same fashion as the general classification, but it was excluse to the riders competing from groups rather than teams.

In the mountains classification, the race organizers selected different mountains that the route crossed and awarded points to the riders who crossed them first.

The winner of the team classification was determined by adding the finish times of the best three cyclists per team together and the team with the lowest total time was the winner. If a team had fewer than three riders finish, they were not eligible for the classification. The group classification was decided in the same manner, but the classification was exclusive to the competing groups.

There was a black jersey (maglia nera) awarded to the rider placed last in the general classification. The classification was calculated in the same manner as the general classification.

The rows in the following table correspond to the jerseys awarded after that stage was run.

Final standings

General classification

Mountains classification

Group rider classification

Team classification

Aftermath

Bartali after the victory, stated "I had become Ginettaccio, but 'Giant of the Mountain' was a nickname no one would yet take away."

References

Footnotes

Citations

Bibliography

 
1946
Giro d'Italia
Giro d'Italia
Giro d'Italia
Giro d'Italia